Songs for Sorrow is the second EP by British-Labanese singer-songwriter Mika. It was released in digital form on 15 May 2009, and in a limited edition book & CD physical form on 8 June 2009. The song "Blue Eyes" was used to promote the EP, and was A-listed on the BBC Radio 2 playlist. The EP received the name Songs for Sorrow because the theme of the songs is sorrow. The physical edition consists of a 68-page hard cover book, containing lyrics and illustrations of the songs. The illustrations were made by some of Mika's favourite artists from around the world.

Track listing

List of artists

Personnel
Alex Hutchinson — design and layout
Da Wack — additional design and layout
Jim Woodring — front cover and endpapers
Mika — concept and art direction
Richard Hogg — additional design and layout

References

Mika (singer) albums
2009 EPs